In polymer chemistry, condensation polymers are any kind of polymers  whose process of polymerization involves a condensation reaction (i.e. a small molecule, such as water or methanol, is produced as a byproduct).  Condensation polymers are formed by polycondensation, when the polymer is formed by condensation reactions between species of all degrees of polymerization, or by condensative chain polymerization, when the polymer is formed by sequential addition of monomers to an active site in a chain reaction.  The main alternative forms of polymerization are chain polymerization and polyaddition, both of which give addition polymers.

Condensation polymerization is a form of step-growth polymerization.  Linear polymers are produced from bifunctional monomers, i.e. compounds with two reactive end-groups. Common condensation polymers include polyamides, polyacetals, and proteins.

Polyamides
One important class of condensation polymers are polyamides. They arise from the reaction of carboxylic acid and an amine.  Examples include nylons and proteins. When prepared from amino-carboxylic acids, e.g. amino acids, the stoichiometry of the polymerization includes co-formation of water:
n H2N-X-CO2H  →  [HN-X-C(O)]n  +  (n-1) H2O

When prepared from diamines and dicarboxylic acids, e.g. the production of nylon 66, the polymerization produces two molecules of water per repeat unit:
n H2N-X-NH2 + n HO2C-Y-CO2H  →  [HN-X-NHC(O)-Y-C(O)]n  +  (2n-1) H2O

Polyesters
Another important class of condensation polymers are polyesters.  They arise from the reaction of a carboxylic acid and an alcohol. An example is polyethyleneterephthalate:
n HO-X-OH + n HO2C-Y-CO2H  →  [O-X-O2C-Y-C(O)]n  +  (2n-1) H2O

Safety and environmental considerations
Condensation polymers tend to be more biodegradable than addition polymers. The peptide or ester bonds between monomers can be hydrolysed, especially in the presence of catalysts or bacterial enzymes.

See also
Biopolymer
Epoxy resins
Polyamide
Polyester

References

External links

Polymers (and condensation polymers) - Virtual Text of Organic Chemistry, William Reusch

Polymer chemistry
Polymerization reactions